The 2021 Tour of Britain was an eight-stage men's professional road cycling stage race. It was the seventeenth running of the modern version of the Tour of Britain and the 80th British tour in total. The race started on 5 September in Penzance, Cornwall, and finished on 12 September in Aberdeen, Scotland. 

The 2.Pro-category race was initially scheduled to be a part of the inaugural edition of the UCI ProSeries, but after the 2020 edition was cancelled due to the COVID-19 pandemic, it made its UCI ProSeries debut in 2021, while also still being a part of the 2021 UCI Europe Tour.

Teams 
On 22 April 2021, race organizers announced the first confirmed teams that would be participating in the race, with those being all five British UCI Continental teams and a British national team. On 10 August 2021, the rest of the invited teams were announced. Seven UCI WorldTeams, four UCI ProTeams, six UCI Continental teams, and the British national team made up the eighteen teams that participated in the race. , with five riders, was the only team to not enter a full squad of six riders. In total, 107 riders started the race, of which 94 finished.

UCI WorldTeams

 
 
 
 
 
 
 

UCI ProTeams

 
 
 
 

UCI Continental Teams

 
 
 
 
 
 

National Teams

 Great Britain

Route 
On 17 March 2021, the start and finish venues, along with partial route details, were unveiled, with some of the route from the cancelled 2020 edition carried over to this year's edition. Cornwall made its race debut as it hosted the Grand Départ and the first stage, before the race continued north into Devon for stage 2. Wales then hosted two full stages for the first time in race history. From there, the race entered North West England, as Cheshire hosted stage 5, while stage 6 started in Cumbria and headed east into North East England. The last two stages took place in Scotland, with Hawick and Aberdeen making their race debuts, while Edinburgh was a first-time finish location. On 20 July, the rest of the route was released.

Stages

Stage 1 
5 September 2021 — Penzance to Bodmin,

Stage 2 
6 September 2021 — Sherford to Exeter,

Stage 3 
7 September 2021 — Llandeilo to National Botanic Garden of Wales,  (TTT)

Stage 4 
8 September 2021 — Aberaeron to Great Orme (Llandudno),

Stage 5 
9 September 2021 — Alderley Park to Warrington,

Stage 6 
10 September 2021 — Carlisle to Gateshead,

Stage 7 
11 September 2021 — Hawick to Edinburgh,

Stage 8 
12 September 2021 — Stonehaven to Aberdeen,

Classification leadership table 

 On stage 2, Nils Eekhoff, who was second in the points classification, wore the cyan jersey, because first-placed Wout van Aert wore the blue jersey as the leader of the general classification.
 On stage 2, Max Walker, who was second in the sprints classification, wore the red jersey, because first-placed Jacob Scott wore the green jersey as the leader of the mountains classification. On stage 3, Walker, who dropped down to third, continued to wear the red jersey, in place of first-placed Scott and second-placed Robin Carpenter, who wore the blue jersey as the leader of the general classification.
 On stage 4, Rory Townsend, who was second in the points classification, wore the cyan jersey, because first-placed Ethan Hayter wore the blue jersey as the leader of the general classification.
 On stages 4–8, Robin Carpenter, who was second in the sprints classification, wore the red jersey, because first-placed Jacob Scott wore the green jersey as the leader of the mountains classification.
 On stage 6, Kristian Sbaragli, who was fifth in the points classification, wore the cyan jersey, because first-placed Ethan Hayter wore the blue jersey as the leader of the general classification, second-placed Julian Alaphilippe wore the rainbow jersey as the defending world road race champion, third-placed Wout van Aert wore the Belgian jersey as the defending Belgian road race champion, and fourth-placed Giacomo Nizzolo wore the European jersey as the defending European road race champion.
 On stage 7, Michael Woods, who was fourth in the points classification, wore the cyan jersey, because first-placed Ethan Hayter wore the blue jersey as the leader of the general classification, second-placed Julian Alaphilippe wore the rainbow jersey as the defending world road race champion, and third-placed Wout van Aert wore the Belgian jersey as the defending Belgian road race champion. For the same reason, Gonzalo Serrano wore the cyan jersey on stage 8.

Final classification standings

General classification

Points classification

Mountains classification

Sprints classification

Team classification

References

Sources

External links 

 

2021
Tour of Britain
Tour of Britain
Tour of Britain
Tour of Britain